Amblyseius neobernhardi is a species of mite in the family Phytoseiidae.

References

neobernhardi
Articles created by Qbugbot
Animals described in 1966